The men's 4 × 400 metres relay event at the 1963 Summer Universiade was held at the Estádio Olímpico Monumental in Porto Alegre in September 1963.

Results

References

Athletics at the 1963 Summer Universiade
1963